is Japanese voice actor Mamoru Miyano's debut single, released on May 23, 2007. It had peaked at #47 on the Oricon charts, and the title track was used as the ending to the anime Kotetsu Sangokushi.

2007 singles
J-pop songs
2007 songs
King Records (Japan) singles